The 2000 winners of the Torneo di Viareggio (in English, the Viareggio Tournament, officially the Viareggio Cup World Football Tournament Coppa Carnevale), the annual youth football tournament held in Viareggio, Tuscany, are listed below.

Format
The 40 teams are seeded in 10 pools, split up into 5-pool groups. Each team from a pool meets the others in a single tie. The winning club from each pool and three best runners-up from both group A and group B progress to the final knockout stage. All matches in the final rounds are single tie. The Round of 16 envisions penalties and no extra time, while the rest of the final round matches include 30 minutes extra time with Golden goal rule and penalties to be played if the draw between teams still holds. Semifinal losing teams play 3rd-place final with penalties after regular time. The winning sides play the final with extra time, no Golden goal rule and repeat the match if the draw holds.

Participating teams
Italian teams

  Atalanta
  Bari
  Brescia
  Empoli
  Fiorentina
  Genoa
  Inter Milan
  Juventus
  Lazio
  Livorno
  Milan
  Napoli
  Parma
  Perugia
  Pistoiese
  Pontedera
  Roma
  Salernitana
  Siena
  Torino
  Verona
  Vicenza

European teams

  Bellinzona
  Lugano
  Hajduk
  AB

African teams

  Jomo Cosmos
  Udoji United

Asian teams
  Maccabi Haifa
American teams

  Pumas
  Commack United NY
  Corinthians
  Vitória
  Campinas
  Santa Catarina
  Irineu
  Linense
  São Bento
  Matsubara

Oceanian teams
  Marconi Stallions

Group stage

Group 1

Group 2

Group 3

Group 4

Group 5

Group 6

Group 7

Group 8

Group 9

Group 10

Knockout stage

Champions

Notes

External links
 Official Site (Italian)
 Results on RSSSF.com

2000
1999–2000 in Italian football
2000 in Brazilian football
1999–2000 in Israeli football
1999–2000 in Swiss football
1999–2000 in Croatian football
1999–2000 in Danish football
1999–2000 in South African soccer
1999–2000 in Mexican football
1999–2000 in Nigerian football
2000 in American soccer
2000 in Australian soccer